Joseph Gebbia Jr. (born August 21, 1981) is an American billionaire designer and Internet entrepreneur. He is a co-founder of Airbnb and Samara, an accessory dwelling unit startup that was formerly Airbnb's design studio, and of Airbnb.org, the company's non-profit foundation. As of July 2022, his net worth was estimated at US$7.4 billion.

Early life
Gebbia was born August 21, 1981, in Atlanta, Georgia, the son of Eileen and Joe Gebbia of Italian ancestors. He grew up in Lawrenceville, Georgia and has one sister, Kimberly. He pursued sports, music, and art throughout childhood, and worked several jobs including as a ball boy for the Atlanta Hawks.

Education 
Gebbia attended Brookwood High School in Snellville, Gwinnett County, Georgia. He graduated in 2005 from the Rhode Island School of Design (RISD) in Providence, Rhode Island, where he received a Bachelor of Fine Arts degree in Graphic Design and Industrial Design. At RISD, he met Brian Chesky, who would later become his roommate and co-founder of Airbnb. Gebbia took supplementary business-related classes at Brown University and Massachusetts Institute of Technology (MIT) while attending RISD.

Career
After graduating from RISD, Gebbia moved to San Francisco to work as a designer for Chronicle Books. In 2007, future AirBnb cofounder, Brian Chesky, moved in with him, and both quit their jobs to start a company together. That same week, their landlord raised rent by 20%, to an amount they could not afford. Knowing that the Industrial Design Society of America conference was coming to San Francisco and many hotels were fully booked, Gebbia came up with the idea of renting out airbeds in their apartment to conference-goers. They marketed the beds by creating a website called "AirBed & Breakfast” and emailed design blogs to garner interest. They received three bookings and were able to pay their rent to stay in the apartment. In 2008, another of Gebbia's roommates, Harvard graduate and technical architect Nathan Blecharczyk, became the third cofounder.

While struggling to find initial angel investors for Airbnb, Gebbia and Chesky created two Airbnb-branded cereals, Obama O’s and Cap’n McCain’s, to sell online during the 2008 election. They found a small manufacturer in Berkeley who agreed to fabricate 1,000 cartons in exchange for a cut of the royalties. The team bought generic Cheerios and Chex, and placed the cereal into their boxes. The boxes, which cost $40 each, received coverage from CNN and Good Morning America; Katy Perry auctioned off an autographed box to her fans. The promotion netted Airbnb $30,000, enough to keep the company afloat until Paul Graham and Y Combinator decided to invest.

Gebbia helped early Airbnb hosts present their listings. When AirBnb was struggling to gain traction in New York City, Gebbia and Chesky booked with two-dozen hosts and discovered that many hosts were taking low-quality photos that did a poor job of presenting the listing. They rented a camera and took high-resolution photos of the listings; as a result, AirBnb's revenue in the city doubled and the AirBnb Photography Program was created.
 
In March 2009, the name of the company was shortened to Airbnb.com, and the site's content had expanded from air beds and shared spaces to properties including entire homes, apartments, and private rooms.

In May 2017, Gebbia launched a modular office furniture business called Neighborhood. The furniture was created for Bernhardt Design, a furniture company that has worked with emerging designers.

On December 10, 2020, Airbnb became a public company via an initial public offering, raising $3.5 billion. As of November 2021, Gebbia’s net worth was estimated at $11.4 billion.

He holds board and advisor roles as a member of the board of directors at Airbnb, and is a member of the board of trustees at Rhode Island School of Design. He was appointed by Tesla, Inc to its board of directors in September 2022.

In July 2022, Gebbia stepped down from his full-time operating role at Airbnb, while remaining on the board of directors in an advisory role.

Samara, formerly a research and design unit of Airbnb established in 2016, became an independent accessory dwelling unit (ADU) startup in 2022. Gebbia announced the launch of its first product in November 2022, a net-zero tiny house called Backyard.

Gebbia is a Mr. Porter Style Council member. He has spoken about his passions for entrepreneurship and impact at the Clinton Global Initiative.

Investments
Gebbia is an investor in female-founded venture capital fund, The Helm. In 2022, Gebbia joined the San Antonio Spurs investor group as its newest strategic partner. In this position, Gebbia is a  minority owner, joining billionaire Michael Dell and San Francisco-based investment firm Sixth Street as fellow investors. He is an investor in Nebia.

Design 
Gebbia has had a longstanding passion for aesthetic and design. He credits his childhood and parents for supporting his well-rounded childhood pursuing art, athletics, and music. Gebbia was known as the “art guy” in grade school when he started his first business selling illustrations of Teenage Mutant Ninja Turtles to his classmates.
 
In high school, Gebbia took classes including ceramics, photography, and  jewelry metal smithing. He also took classes in figure drawing and painting at the Atlanta College of Art on weekends. During high school, he also gained acceptance to the Governor’s Honor’s Program, where he spent a summer taking college-level art courses. There, one of his professors encouraged him to go to RISD, and he spent the following summer taking courses on the campus.
 
In one of his first courses at RISD, Gebbia took a 3D foundations class with a semester-long project aiming to produce 12-inch scale works of a famous artist or designer. Gebbia decided he wanted to create life-size models so he could use them afterwards, but his professor dismissed the idea and told to stick to the achievable. Gebbia set out to prove his professor wrong and produced sixteen full-sized chairs for his final project. He refers to this anecdote as one of several examples that allowed him to transcend beliefs of what was possible. Around this time, Gebbia also became inspired by the work of Charles and Ray Eames and switched his studies from painting to industrial design. Gebbia has emphasized the importance of his design background in preparing him for entrepreneurship. One of his first design-business ventures was CritBuns—soft, foamy cushions to keep art students’ pants clean during their hours-long critique sessions, known as "crits". He developed the idea at RISD and the design was selected as the senior gift for his graduating class of 800 students. After two years developing his sales pitch and story, I.D. included CritBuns for their Best of 2006 Issue which created awareness in other countries. A variety of retailers sold CritBUns.
 
Prior to Airbnb, Gebbia worked at Chronicle Books where he was the only industrial designer in a company of 200 people who focused on graphic design. In that context, he learned to explain industrial design to others in a way that fit into their world view. He also founded ecolet, a green-design website.
 
His design focus also led to a surge in bookings after Gebbia offered free professional photography services from a community of over 2,000 freelancers.
 
In 2017, Gebbia also launched his own collection of  modular office furniture, called Neighborhood, at the ICFF furniture fair as a part of New York City’s design week. He created the collection for Bernhardt Design, a furniture company known for working with international and emerging designers. The LEGO-like collection earned featured recognition in publications like Designboom, the first and most popular digital magazine for architecture and design culture, Quartz, Dezeen, and Interior Design. Gebbia supported the newly formed Eames Institute for Infinite Curiosity, aimed at broadening the influence of Ray and Charles Eames through exhibitions from the Eames Collection.

Social impact 
Gebbia has an interest in philanthropy, particularly  refugee relief and housing support. In 2020, he and his team launched Airbnb.org, a non-profit that enables hosts on Airbnb to house people in times of crisis. Gebbia’s personal donation of $5 million helped kick off the fund’s efforts to house refugees and asylum seekers, including 20,000  Afghan refugees in the United States.
 
In December 2020, Gebbia made a $25 million personal donation to benefit two San Francisco charities working to end homelessness in the Bay Area, Rising Up - Larkin Street Youth Services and All Home. Both organizations aid individuals facing economic hardship as a result of the COVID-19 pandemic. Gebbia also has made a personal donation to the Kevin Durant Charity Foundation which was used to redevelop basketball and tennis courts at the Hayes Valley Playground in San Francisco – marrying his passion for design, philanthropy and athletics, becoming one of his favorite projects.
 
He serves on the Advisory Council for  United Nations (UN) High Commissioner for Refugees and traveled with the group to Jordan to further educate himself on refugee conditions. He also is on the Leadership Council of the Malala Fund. Gebbia traveled with Malala Yousafzai to Kenya and Rwanda to work on girls’ education in refugee camps.
 
In 2017, Gebbia brought Yeonmi Park, a North Korean refugee as his guest to the Met Gala to bring attention to the issue of global-refugee security. Park was featured on the front page of The New York Times style section following the event.
 
Gebbia is also among the youngest members to join the Giving Pledge, created by Bill and Melinda Gates with Warren Buffett. The group signifies a commitment from wealthy individuals to give more than half of their wealth towards philanthropy. Gebbia has made donations to service-led companies and projects, including Thorn, Educate Girls, and others.

Gebbia sits on the board of trustees of his alma mater, the Rhode Island School of Design (RISD). A former scholarship recipient, Gebbia pledged $300,000 to his alma mater RISD to create an endowed fund that will make the school accessible for students in need of financial assistance.

In 2022, Gebbia was the graduation speaker at his alma mater, Brookwood High School. He pledged 22 shares of Airbnb stock to all 890 graduates, a gift worth $2.1 million.

In 2023, Gebbia made a $25 million gift to The Ocean Cleanup, the organization’s largest private donation to date. The gift expands climate health and ocean sustainability operations across oceans, rivers, recycling, and research. Funds particularly support deployment of the organization’s System 03 cleaning technology in the Great Pacific Garbage Patch.

Documentary work 
In 2020, Gebbia served as executive producer on the documentary film “Universe,” which follows jazz trumpeter Wallace Roney, Miles Davis’s protégé, as he convenes an orchestra to perform a rediscovered orchestral jazz suite by Wayne Shorter—written in 1966 for Miles Davis but never before performed. The film premiered weeks after Roney died from complications of COVID-19, making it one of the very first films to be shaped by the 2020’s global pandemic.
 
Gebbia also executive produced a documentary, in partnership with XTR, following the Refugee Olympic Team at the Olympics before, during and after the 2020 Tokyo Games. The Tokyo Refugee Olympic Team consisted of 29 athletes, originating from 11 countries and residing in 13 host nations.

Recognition 
In 2009, Gebbia was listed in BusinessWeek's Top 20 Best Young Tech Entrepreneurs. In 2010, he was named in Inc. Magazine's Thirty under Thirty, and 2013, he was named in Fortune Magazine's Forty-under-Forty. Gebbia was also named one of Fast Company’s Most Creative People. Gebbia is also included in The Chronicle of Philanthropy’s 2021 list of America’s 50 Biggest Charity Donors, alongside Jeff Bezos, MacKenzie Scott, and Michael Bloomberg.

Personal life
He lives in Austin, Texas. Gebbia has a rescue dog named after the Airbnb logo, Bélo.

References

External links
 How I Built This - Airbnb: Joe Gebbia

1981 births
Living people
People from Atlanta
People from San Francisco
Rhode Island School of Design alumni
21st-century American businesspeople
American billionaires
American people of Italian descent
Real estate company founders
Giving Pledgers
21st-century philanthropists
Y Combinator people